Mauricio Adolfo Cabrera Valdez (born September 22, 1993) is a Dominican professional baseball pitcher who is currently a free agent. He has previously played in Major League Baseball (MLB) for the Atlanta Braves.

Career

Atlanta Braves
Cabrera signed with the Atlanta Braves as an international free agent in July 2010. He made his professional debut the following season with the Dominican Summer League Braves, logging a 1–5 record and 4.30 ERA in 19 appearances. In 2012, Cabrera played for the rookie ball Danville Braves, recording a 2.97 ERA in 12 games. He spent the 2013 season with the Single-A Rome Braves, posting a 3–8 record and 4.18 ERA in 24 appearances. The next year, he split the season between the GCL Braves and the High-A Lynchburg Hillcats, pitching to a 5.73 ERA with 31 strikeouts in 33.0 innings of work. The Braves added Cabrera to the team's 40-man roster on November 19, 2014.

Cabrera spent the 2015 season with the High-A Carolina Mudcats and also made 13 appearances for the Double-A Mississippi Braves, accumulating a 5.59 ERA in 36 appearances. Cabrera participated in the Arizona Fall League after the season. The Braves promoted Cabrera to the major leagues for the first time on June 27, 2016. He made his major league debut that day against the Cleveland Indians, pitching one inning, in which he yielded one hit. Three days later, Cabrera recorded his first career save against the Miami Marlins. He finished his rookie season with a 5–1 record with 6 saves and a 2.82 ERA. His four-seam fastball had the second-highest average speed of any MLB pitcher's pitches in 2016, at 100.4 mph.

Cabrera suffered a strained right elbow in Spring Training in 2017, and began the season on the disabled list. He spent the entire season in the minors, mainly with the Triple-A Gwinnett Braves, where he struggled to a 7.86 ERA in 24 games. On February 19, 2018, Cabrera was designated for assignment following the signing of Peter Moylan. He was outrighted to Triple-A Gwinnett on February 20 and invited to Spring Training as a non-roster invitee. After stumbling to an 11.03 ERA in 31 games for the High-A Florida Fire Frogs, Cabrera was released by the organization on July 11, 2018.

Chicago White Sox
On July 20, 2018, Cabrera signed a minor league deal with the Chicago White Sox. He spent the remainder of the year in the White Sox minor league system, spending time with the rookie ball AZL White Sox, where he struggled to a 11.00 ERA in 9 games, and the Double-A Birmingham Barons, where he put up a ghastly 20.25 ERA in 2 appearances. Cabrera returned to Birmingham for the 2019 season, logging a 4–3 record and 4.50 ERA in 48.0 innings of work. On November 4, 2019, he elected free agency.

Arizona Diamondbacks
On November 14, 2019, Cabrera signed a minor league contract with the Arizona Diamondbacks organization. Cabrera was released by the Diamondbacks organization on May 22, 2020.

Guerreros de Oaxaca
On June 3, 2021, Cabrera signed with the Guerreros de Oaxaca of the Mexican League. Cabrera struggled to a 13.50 ERA in 3 appearances for Oaxaca before being released on June 15.

Scouting report

Personal life
His brother, Alberto Cabrera, played baseball professionally for the Chicago Cubs.

References

External links

1993 births
Living people
Arizona League White Sox players
Atlanta Braves players
Birmingham Barons players
Carolina Mudcats players
Danville Braves players
Dominican Republic expatriate baseball players in the United States
Dominican Summer League Braves players
Florida Fire Frogs players
Gulf Coast Braves players
Gwinnett Braves players
Lynchburg Hillcats players
Major League Baseball players from the Dominican Republic
Major League Baseball pitchers
Mississippi Braves players
People from San Juan Province (Dominican Republic)
Peoria Javelinas players
Rome Braves players
Tigres del Licey players